Darrell Bricker is a Canadian author, pollster, public speaker, political scientist and political commentator.

Profession

Pollster
Bricker is the current Global CEO of Ipsos Public Affairs, a polling, research, marketing, and analysis company.

While Bricker was completing his B.A. studies, he began to specialize in research, polling, and analysis methods.  This led to further specialization during his M.A. and Ph.D.

After completing his Ph.D. at Carleton University in 1989, Bricker was hired in the Office of Prime Minister Brian Mulroney as the Director of Public Opinion Research. After a year in the Prime Minister's Office, Bricker was hired by the Angus Reid Group, a polling and analysis company that eventually merged with Ipsos.

Author
Bricker has published several academic articles and five books.  All five books have become Canadian bestsellers:

 Searching for Certainty: Inside the New Canadian Mindset, DoubleDay (2001)
 What Canadians Think About Almost Everything, DoubleDay (2005)
 We Know What You’re Thinking, HarperCollins (2009)
 Canuckology, HarperCollins (2010)
 The Big Shift: The Seismic Change in Canadian Politics, Business, and Culture and What It Means for Our Future (with John Ibbitson), HarperCollins (2013)
 Empty Planet: The Shock of Global Population Decline (with John Ibbitson), McClelland & Stewart, 2019

Honorary Colonel
In 2010, The Queen's York Rangers, a Canadian Forces armoured reconnaissance reserve unit in Toronto, appointed Bricker as an honorary colonel. Honorary colonels are appointed by the Minister of National Defence for being "distinguished Canadians who have contributed to the country through business, politics, the arts, sports, education, entertainment, or through previous military service."

Media commentator
As a pollster, Bricker is regularly called upon to give media commentary on a variety of topics, including Canadian politics, social demographics, immigration, military policy, industry and business affairs, and federal and provincial affairs.  Bricker regularly writes columns for The National Post and The Globe and Mail.

Other
Bricker also holds numerous other positions:

 Senior Fellow, Centre for International Governance Innovation
Board Member, Laurier Institute for the Study of Public Opinion and Policy
 Member, Fundraising Cabinet, Fort York's Visitor Centre
 Member, Royal Canadian Military Institute
 Advisor, Economic Development Committee, Business Advisory Group for the City of Toronto
 Member, American Association of Public Opinion Research
 (Former) Doctoral Fellow, Social Science and Humanities Research Council

Education
Bricker completed his B.A. in 1983 and his M.A. in 1984, both at Wilfrid Laurier University.  He completed his Ph.D. at Carleton University in 1989 and received an Honorary LL.D. from Wilfrid Laurier University in 2010.

Background
Bricker lives in Toronto with his wife, Nina, and his daughter, Emily.

References

Living people
Canadian non-fiction writers
Writers from Toronto
Pollsters
Canadian political commentators
Year of birth missing (living people)
Place of birth missing (living people)